Erigeron incertus, the hairy daisy, is a species of flowering plant in the family Asteraceae. It is found only in the Falkland Islands. Its natural habitat is temperate shrubland. It is threatened by habitat loss.

References

incertus
Flora of the Falkland Islands
Vulnerable plants
Taxonomy articles created by Polbot